Citizen Verdict is a 2003 British-German drama film directed by Philippe Martinez and starring Armand Assante, Jerry Springer and Roy Scheider.

Cast
Armand Assante as Sam Patterson
Jerry Springer as Marty Rockman
Roy Scheider as Governor Bull Tyler
Raffaello Degruttola as Ricky Carr
Dorette Potgieter as Carlene Osway
Justine Mitchell as Jessica Landers
Gideon Emery as Larry Grimes
Adrian Galley as William Doby
Langley Kirkwood as Vince Turner
Brendan Pollecutt as Bob White

Reception
The film has a 20% rating on Rotten Tomatoes.  Jamie Russell of the BBC awarded the film two stars out of five.  Steve Persall of the Tampa Bay Times graded the film a C−.

References

External links
 
 

British drama films
German drama films
English-language German films
2000s English-language films
2000s British films
2000s German films